Alpaslan Güneş (born 1926) was a Turkish equestrian. He competed in two events at the 1956 Summer Olympics.

References

External links
 

1926 births
Possibly living people
Turkish male equestrians
Olympic equestrians of Turkey
Equestrians at the 1956 Summer Olympics